John Guy may refer to:

 John Guy (New Zealand cricketer) (born 1934), played 12 Test matches for New Zealand 1955–61
 John Guy (English cricketer) (1916–1997), English cricketer who played first-class cricket for Oxford University, Kent and Warwickshire
 John Guy (colonial administrator) (1568–1629), coloniser of Newfoundland
 John Guy (historian) (born 1949), British historian of Tudor England
 John J. Guy (born 1950), British educationalist
 John Hudson Guy, Chief Justice of Jamaica in 1749